Mario Brkljača (born 7 February 1985) is a retired Croatian footballer who played as a midfielder.

Club career 
Born in Zagreb, Brkljača began his senior career with hometown side Zagreb.

During the winter transfer window of 2008–09, Brkljača joined Hajduk Split. After a successful short spell at Hajduk, he signed for Italian club side Cagliari Calcio on 8 August 2009 on loan. After an unsuccessful loan spell at the Italian club, he returned to Hajduk.

On 16 January 2015, Brkljača signed a one-and-a-half-year contract with CSKA Sofia in Bulgaria. He left the team after the conclusion of the second half of the 2014/2015 season.

References

External links
 
 

1985 births
Living people
Footballers from Zagreb
Association football midfielders
Croatian footballers
Croatia youth international footballers
Croatia under-21 international footballers
NK Zagreb players
HNK Hajduk Split players
Cagliari Calcio players
FC Sibir Novosibirsk players
SV Mattersburg players
PFC CSKA Sofia players
NK Krka players
Croatian Football League players
Russian First League players
2. Liga (Austria) players
First Professional Football League (Bulgaria) players
Slovenian PrvaLiga players
Croatian expatriate footballers
Expatriate footballers in Italy
Expatriate footballers in Russia
Expatriate footballers in Austria
Expatriate footballers in Bulgaria
Expatriate footballers in Slovenia
Croatian expatriate sportspeople in Italy
Croatian expatriate sportspeople in Russia
Croatian expatriate sportspeople in Austria
Croatian expatriate sportspeople in Bulgaria
Croatian expatriate sportspeople in Slovenia